Czyszczon or Czyszczoń is a Polish surname. Notable people with the surname include:

 David Czyszczon (born 1981), German footballer
 Magdalena Czyszczoń (born 1995), Polish speed skater

Polish-language surnames